The Northern Mariana Islands women's national football team is the international women's football team of the Commonwealth of the Northern Mariana Islands, controlled by the Northern Mariana Islands Football Association.

The association is a member of the East Asian Football Federation and the Asian Football Confederation.

Results and fixtures

The following is a list of match results in the last 12 months, as well as any future matches that have been scheduled.

Legend

2018

Coaching staff

Current coaching staff

Manager history

, after the match against .

(If statistics are unavailable, display former coaches in bulleted list form)

Players

Current squad
The following players were called up for the match against  on xx August 2018.
Information correct as of 14 January 2022

(Players are listed within position group by kit number, order of caps, then alphabetically)
<small>(Players' ages, caps, goals and clubs should be up to date – not as of the squad announcement, as per this discussion)</small>

Recent call-ups
The following players have also been called up to the Northern Mariana Islands squad within the last twelve months.

Notes
INJ = Withdrew due to injury
PRE = Preliminary squad / standby
RET = Retired from the national team
SUS = Serving suspension
WD = Player withdrew from the squad due to non-injury issue.

(Players are listed within position group by order of latest call-up, caps, and then alphabetically)
(Injury icons should not be used in rosters as they violate MOS:TEXTASIMAGES as outlined in this discussion)

Records

, after the match against .Players in bold are still active with Northern Mariana Islands.Most appearances

Top goalscorers

(If the section features an image, remove the columned formatting)

Competitive record
AFC Women's Asian Cup*Draws include knockout matches decided on penalty kicks. As the AFC Women's Asian Cup is also qualification for the FIFA Women's World Cup, the Northern Mariana Islands are ineligible for the World Cup. Starting with the 2022 Women's Asian Cup qualifying round, they are allowed to qualify for the Asian Cup only.EAFF E-1 Football Championship*Draws include knockout matches decided on penalty kicks.''

See also

 Sports in the Northern Mariana Islands
 Football in the Northern Mariana Islands
 Women's football in the Northern Mariana Islands
 Northern Mariana Islands men's national football team

References

External links
 Official website 

Asian women's national association football teams